William Jules Filante (October 22, 1929 in Brooklyn, NY – December 9, 1992 in Terra Linda, San Rafael, CA) was an American physician and politician from California and member of the Republican Party.

State Assembly
Filante first won election to the Marin-Sonoma based 9th district in the California State Assembly in 1978 by defeating Democratic incumbent Michael Wornum.  Thanks to his moderate voting record, Filante became a pro at winning crossover votes, enough to hold his left-leaning seat with relative ease for 7 terms.  In 1992 he ran for election to the Congress.

Congressional race
Filante made a run for the Marin county-based 6th Congressional district being vacated by Democrat Barbara Boxer, who was running for the United States Senate.  Even though the 6th District was heavily Democratic, Filante had represented a large chunk of it in the state legislature for 14 years and tried to parlay his moderate reputation into a win.  However, just before the start of the campaign, Filante underwent brain surgery and spent most of the race recuperating. Fellow GOP assemblywoman Bev Hansen often served as his surrogate.  In the end, Democrat Lynn Woolsey won handily.  Filante died of a brain tumor later that December.

Electoral history

References

External links
JoinCalifornia, Election History for the State of California

Republican Party members of the California State Assembly
San Francisco Bay Area politicians
Deaths from brain cancer in the United States
Deaths from cancer in California
Neurological disease deaths in California
1929 births
1992 deaths
20th-century American politicians